The Mark 13 torpedo was the U.S. Navy's most common aerial torpedo of World War II. It was the first American torpedo to be originally designed for launching from aircraft only. They were also used on PT boats.

Design

Originating in a 1925 design study, the Mark 13 was subject to changing USN requirements through its early years with resulting on-and-off development. Early models—even when dropped low to the water at slow speeds—were prone to running on the surface, or not running at all.

The Mark 13 ran  slower than the Mark 14 torpedo, a characteristic which, along with a lesser mass, lesser negative buoyancy and the lack of a magnetic influence feature in its Mark IV exploder, meant that it did not suffer from some of the same problems as its larger siblings. 17,000 were produced during the war.

Wartime development
By 1942, poor combat performance had made it apparent that there were problems with the Mark 13, as 35 out of 41 torpedo bombers were lost at the Battle of Midway without scoring a single hit:

The Committee assigned the California Institute of Technology to undertake the first systematic study of the dynamics of aerial launched torpedoes.  Tank tests using scale models revealed that the "low and slow" approach that had been presumed necessary for a successful drop was actually counterproductive: striking the water at a flat angle frequently caused the after body of the torpedo to “slap”, damaging the mechanism.  Full scale testing simulated aerial torpedo drops under controlled conditions by pneumatically launching full size torpedoes down a  slide on California's Morris Dam into a mountain lake known for its clarity, allowing all aspects of the water entry to be examined utilizing high-speed photography. Fragile or vulnerable components were improved, tested, refined, and tested again. Improved components were shipped to Newport Rhode Island for air drop testing – 4,300 drops in all. The Caltech study led to the development of "drag rings"  that slowed and stabilized the torpedo in flight and cushioned its impact with the water and "shroud rings"  (also known as the "ring tail") that reinforced the vulnerable tail fins.  They also tested and developed a box-shaped wooden tail that stabilized the torpedo in flight and absorbed energy as it was stripped off as the torpedo entered the water, based on the Kyoban series of similar aerodynamic tails, first developed in 1936 by the Japanese for their Type 91 torpedo used at the attack on Pearl Harbor, but first observed at the Battle of the Coral Sea on May 8, 1942.

Experiment soon revealed that optimum water entry angles were approximately 22-32 degrees relative to the plane of the surface: the torpedo might plunge as deep as  but it would return to its set depth and bearing if the mechanism was undamaged. This enabled the US Navy to develop a series of attack profiles that varied the combination of speed and altitude to produce the ideal 22-32 degree water entry angle. Multiple attack profile options also allowed strike planners to de-conflict attack routes by assigning each torpedo squadron a different attack profile, greatly reducing the risk of mid-air collision over the target. Combined with radar that delivered the exact range to the target, the results proved to be remarkable:

Deployment on PT boats

In 1942, US Navy Patrol Torpedo (PT) boats operating in the South Pacific were experiencing shortages of 21 inch (53 cm) Mark 8 and Mark 10 torpedoes and confronting large numbers of Japanese Daihatsu barges, which were generally too shallow to attack with torpedoes.  Installing larger batteries of heavy machine guns and cannon on PT boats to deal with the barges was attempted.  Such installations caused weight and stability problems, and torpedoes were still needed to counter larger Japanese vessels such as destroyers and cruisers.

One solution, implemented in 1943, was to replace each of the PT Boat's two to four Mark 8 torpedoes, and their Mark 18 torpedo tubes, with the significantly lighter Mark 13, carried in lightweight Mark 1 launching racks, at a total savings of more than  each.  The shorter Mark 13 also took up less deck space. The racks took advantage of the Mark 13's air-drop capability by simply allowing the torpedoes to roll over the side, eliminating the risks of a "hot run" within the tube and the flare of burning grease that sometimes gave away the PT boat's position upon firing.  The Mark 13 also had the advantage of a significantly larger warhead ( vs. ), containing the significantly more powerful explosive  Torpex, which was approximately 1.5 times more powerful per unit of weight than TNT.  The Mark 13's shorter range and slower speed were considered acceptable tradeoffs for boats that usually operated at night and relied on stealth to reach firing position.

See also
 Mark 21 Mod 2 torpedo, a development for use in the AUM-N-2 Petrel missile.
 Mark 25 torpedo
 GT-1 (missile)

References

External links

  – This film shows examples of several attack profiles developed by the US navy using Caltech research.
 
 

World War II naval weapons
Torpedoes of the United States
Aerial torpedoes
World War II weapons of the United States
Weapons and ammunition introduced in 1936